Liverpool Exchange railway station was a railway station located in the city centre of Liverpool, England. Of the four terminal stations in Liverpool's city centre, Exchange station was the only station not accessed via a tunnel.

The station was badly damaged during World War II and lost a large proportion of the trainshed roof, which was never rebuilt, remaining an iron frame. It was closed in 1977, being replaced by the new  underground station nearby.

Station construction and opening 

The grandly-appointed station opened on 13 May 1850, replacing an earlier temporary station at Great Howard Street further north up the track. The station was designed by John Hawkshaw. The station had two names because the joint owners could not agree on a name. The Lancashire and Yorkshire Railway (LYR) named the station Liverpool Exchange Station with the East Lancashire Railway (ELR) naming the station Liverpool Tithebarn Street. From 1 October 1850 trains of the Liverpool, Crosby and Southport Railway (LCSR) began to run into Exchange/Tithebarn Street station with three companies using the terminus. The LCSR became part of the LYR on 14 June 1855. On 13 August 1859, the LYR absorbed the ELR, from which date the name of the station was Liverpool Exchange.

The station was the terminus of the ELR's line to Preston, the LYR's route to Bolton and the LCSR routes to Crosby and Southport.

The station was elevated with ramps for road vehicles to access the station. The existing station could not cope with demand by the 1880s. The approaches were widened to accommodate more tracks. The station was extensively rebuilt and enlarged between 1886 and 1888 and was completed on 2 July 1888. Its site expanded from the original location to cover Clarke's Basin (the original end of the Leeds-Liverpool Canal). The station continued to be the Liverpool terminus of the LYR and was also the terminus of the company's Liverpool to Manchester line.

Under four extremely long glass train-shed roofs lay ten platforms, with an access roadway between platforms 3 and 4, providing long-distance services to destinations such as Manchester Victoria, Blackpool North, the Lake District, Whitehaven, Glasgow Central, Bradford Exchange and Leeds Central.

Author and First World War poet Siegfried Sassoon frequently lodged in the hotel adjoining Exchange station. In 1917, after having earlier written at his London club his A Soldier's Declaration which appeared in the press and was read to the House of Commons, Sassoon was visited at the hotel by Colonel Jones Williams who reprimanded him for his actions. It was from Exchange station that Sassoon made his famous trip to Formby the next day, ripped the ribbon of his Military Cross off his tunic and flung it into the waters at the mouth of the Mersey.

World War II damage

During World War II Liverpool, being a prime convoy port, was a major strategic target for German aircraft bombers. Damage was caused to the approach lines to Liverpool Exchange. In December 1940 the viaduct north of the station received a direct bomb hit and collapsed. The collapse precluded trains from running into the station. Commuter services were diverted to Southport's Lord Street station from Liverpool Central High Level. The route was much longer initially running south to Hunts Cross from Liverpool Central High Level, then circling Liverpool via the North Liverpool Extension Line to the east of the city heading north to Aintree and onto Southport. The temporary service ran from 24 December 1940 until 5 July 1941.

Temporary wooden bridges were built over the collapsed section of the viaduct restoring electric services. The bridges were not strong enough to take steam-hauled trains. Steam-hauled trains and main line services were resumed on 18 August 1941 terminating at Kirkdale with passengers transferring to buses or trams to the city centre. In May 1941 the worst air raids of the war hit Liverpool. A northern section of the train-shed roof at Liverpool Exchange was badly damaged and required demolition. Other parts remained iron frames until closure in the 1970s. Train services to Liverpool Exchange returned in late 1942.

Electrification
From March 1904, electric trains replaced steam hauled trains in the operation of suburban passenger services to Southport Chapel Street. The journey time was significantly shorter than the route followed by the Cheshire Lines Committee's Liverpool Central to Southport Lord Street service, as the LYR's route followed a more direct route parallel with the coast, serving growing intermediate communities. The LYR route therefore proved extremely popular with passengers. The line to Ormskirk was also subsequently electrified, being completed in 1913.

Operations post-World War II 

On 3 August 1968, the last British Rail scheduled passenger train to be hauled by a standard gauge steam locomotive ended its journey at Liverpool Exchange, Stanier 'Black 5' no. 45318 having hauled from Preston the Liverpool portion of the evening Glasgow to Liverpool and Manchester train.

Long-distance services from Exchange switched to Liverpool Lime Street in the 1960s, with trains to Yorkshire, Blackpool and the Lake District being withdrawn in 1969 and Glasgow trains following suit in 1970. Exchange was left with only medium-distance journeys to Wigan and Bolton, operated by diesel multiple units, plus the still-busy urban electric services to Southport and Ormskirk.

Closure
The programme of route closures in 1963, known as the Beeching Axe, included the closure of two of Liverpool's mainline terminal stations,  and  High Level in Liverpool, and also Woodside Station in Birkenhead.

The Beeching Report in 1963 recommended the closure of the Liverpool Exchange to Southport electric commuter route, and the line to Wigan Wallgate via Rainford Junction. The Liverpool Exchange to Preston via Ormskirk was not recommended for closure. All routes into Liverpool Central High Level station were recommended for closure. Long- and medium-distance routes were to be concentrated on Lime Street station.

Liverpool City Council took a different view, and proposed the retention of the suburban services around the city and their integration into a regional rapid-transit network. This approach was backed up by the Merseyside Area Land Use and Transportation Study, the MALTS report. Liverpool City Council's proposal was adopted and Merseyrail was born.

For Exchange, Liverpool Central High Level and Birkenhead Woodside stations this meant:

 Long and Medium Distance Routes - Lime Street Station in Liverpool city centre was to remain, absorbing the long- to medium-distance passenger traffic of the closed terminal stations.
 Local urban routes - The local urban services served by the terminal stations would be absorbed by the new Merseyrail urban network.

In the early 1970s, four of the platforms at Exchange were closed and demolished to enable tunnelling work to begin for the Merseyrail underground. Part of this ambitious scheme involved diverting the Ormskirk and Southport electric services under Exchange station and into a new tunnel running north to south under Liverpool's city centre, named the Link Tunnel, linking separate lines in the north and south of the city creating a north–south crossrail. Exchange station would be replaced by a station in the new tunnel named Moorfields. Trains formerly serving Exchange station call at the new nearby Moorfields underground station then continue in the tunnel to terminate at Liverpool Central underground station, or onwards to Hunts Cross in the extreme south of the city. At both Moorfields and Central stations easy interchange was possible for the first time with Wirral Line services, which until then had operated as a completely separate network.

Liverpool Exchange closed on Saturday 30 April 1977. The replacement Moorfields station opened the following Monday, 2 May.

Within a few years of closure the old station was demolished by Oldham Bros, a local demolition company.  However, the frontage of the station building was preserved and incorporated into a new office building built behind, named Mercury Court. The station site is still largely intact used as surface car parking. The approaches to the station still exist on the old brick viaducts. The lines descend and disappear just before Leeds Street and down under the old station into the Link Tunnel of the Merseyrail Northern Line. Parts of the original station wall can still be seen when walking down Pall Mall or Bixteth Street.

Reopening for high-speed rail

The route of HS2 has not been fully determined. There are calls by local architects to open Exchange station extending over Leeds Street to the north and onto the approach viaduct. The proposal is to branch off the 1830 Liverpool-Manchester line at Broad Green and onto the North Liverpool Extension trackbed. The line runs to the north then curves to the south at Walton and Kirkdale. The old Exchange station site is in the heart of Liverpool's business quarter and not far from the cruise liner terminal and the Liverpool Waters development.

Station masters

John Ingham 1879 - 1897
Thomas Wood ca. 1897 - 1902 (formerly assistant station master at Manchester Victoria)
Frederick Shaw 1902 - 1921
James Abram 1921 - 1930 (formerly station master at Blackburn)
James Hale 1930 - 1932 (formerly station master at Blackburn)
William Miller 1932 - 1938
Sidney RIchard Sayer 1938 - 1943 (formerly station master at Blackburn)
Francis Joseph Boothroyd 1943 - 1956
Robert W. Ward 1956 - 1961
Matthew Edward Redhead 1961 - 1964 (formerly station master at Rugby)
Walter Bishop 1964 - 1966 (afterwards station master at Bootle)

See also
 LYR electric units

References

Notes

Bibliography

Further reading

External links
 Photograph of Mercury Court
 Disused Stations

Disused railway stations in Liverpool
Former buildings and structures in Liverpool
Former Lancashire and Yorkshire Railway stations
Railway stations in Great Britain opened in 1850
Railway stations in Great Britain closed in 1977